McKinnon Broadcasting Company (doing business as Texas Television, Inc.) is a privately owned television broadcasting company based in San Diego, California. Michael Dean McKinnon Sr. is the company's majority owner, president, chief executive officer (CEO), and chairman of the board.

Stations

Current

Former 
Notes:
 (**) – indicates a station built and signed on by McKinnon.

This list does not include KBVO-TV (now KEYE-TV) in Austin. KBVO-TV (unrelated to the present-day station that serves Austin, but is licensed to Llano) was owned by the Austin Television Company from 1983 to 1995.  Michael McKinnon was among the group of local investors who were part of the Austin Television Company.

Other notes:
 1 McKinnon provided technical support and was a minority owner of KUSI-TV at launch; it acquired the license outright from United States International University in 1990.

Magazines

Former
San Diego Home/Garden Lifestyles

References

Television broadcasting companies of the United States
Companies based in San Diego
Privately held companies based in California